Piece, originally serialized as , is a Japanese manga series written and illustrated by Hinako Ashihara. It was serialized in Shogakukan's Betsucomi magazine, premiering in the May 2008 issue and concluding in the May 2013 issue (each released on April 13 in their respective years) Shogakukan collected the individual chapters into 10 bound volumes from December 2008, to June 2013.

in 2013, Piece won the 58th Shogakukan Manga Award in the shōjo category.

Plot
After learning that her former high school classmate, Haruka Origuchi, has died from an illness, Mizuho Suga meets her other classmate, Hikaru Narumi, at the funeral. Back in their high school days, Hikaru was famous for being a playboy, and they both had to keep their relationship a secret.

Characters
 , portrayed by Tsubasa Honda
 , portrayed by Yuma Nakayama
 , portrayed by Airi Suzuki
 , portrayed by 
 , portrayed by Hokuto Matsumura
 , portrayed by Elina Mizuno
 , portrayed by 
 , portrayed by 
 , portrayed by 
 , portrayed by 
 , portrayed by Naho Toda
 , portrayed by Yuma Nakayama

Media

Manga
Piece written and illustrated by Hinako Ashihara. It was serialized in Shogakukan's Betsucomi magazine, premiering in the May 2008 issue and concluding in the May 2013 issue (each released on April 13 in their respective years). Shogakukan collected the individual chapters into 10 bound volumes from December 24, 2008, to June 26, 2013. It is licensed in France by Kana, in Germany by Tokyopop Germany, and in Italy by Panini Comics.

Live-action series
Piece was also adapted into a live-action television drama series which aired on NTV in Japan from October 6, 2012, to December 29, 2012.

Reception
Piece won the 58th Shogakukan Manga Award in the shōjo category in 2013.

Volume 6 of the manga sold 41,935 copies as of July 31, 2011; volume 7 sold 43,668 copies as of January 1, 2012; volume 8 sold 45,292 copies as of July 1, 2012; and volume 9 sold 68,456 copies as of January 6, 2013.

References

External links
 
  
 Official TV drama website 

2008 manga
2012 Japanese television series debuts
2012 Japanese television series endings
Drama anime and manga
Japanese television dramas based on manga
Nippon TV dramas
Romance anime and manga
Shogakukan franchises
Shogakukan manga
Shōjo manga
Winners of the Shogakukan Manga Award for shōjo manga